The Apostolic Nunciature to Seychelles is an ecclesiastical office of the Catholic Church in Seychelles. It is a diplomatic post of the Holy See, whose representative is called the Apostolic Nuncio with the rank of an ambassador that enjoys some additional privileges. The Nunciature was established in 1985. The Nuncio holds several titles, giving him responsibilities in Madagascar, Mauritius and Comoros as well as Seychelles; he resides in Madagascar.

List of papal representatives 
Clemente Faccani (7 February 1985 - 14 May 1994)
Blasco Francisco Collaço (14 May 1994 - 13 April 1996)
Adriano Bernardini (15 June 1996 - 24 July 1999)
Bruno Musarò (25 September 1999 - 10 February 2004) 
Augustine Kasujja (22 April 2004 - 2 February 2010)
Eugene Nugent (13 March 2010 - 10 January 2015)
Paolo Rocco Gualtieri (26 September 2015 - 6 August 2022)
Tomasz Grysa (9 February 2023 - present)

See also
Catholic Church in Seychelles

References 

 
Holy See–Seychelles relations
Seychelles
Vatican City